Heterocithara granolirata is an extinct species of sea snail, a marine gastropod mollusk in the family Mangeliidae.

Description
The length of the shell attains 6.2 mm, its diameter 2.75 mm.

Distribution
This extinct marine species is endemic to Australia and was found in Middle Miocene strata at Balcombe Bay, Mornington, Victoria

References

 Powell, Arthur William Baden. "The Australian Tertiary Mollusca of the Family Turridae." Records of the Auckland Institute and Museum 3.1 (1944): 3–68.

External links
  Tucker, J.K. 2004 Catalog of recent and fossil turrids (Mollusca: Gastropoda). Zootaxa 682:1–1295.

granolirata
Gastropods described in 1944
Gastropods of Australia
Extinct gastropods